Harold Lavern "Tuffy" Stratton (December 21, 1920 – August 17, 1994) was an American football coach. He served as the head football coach at Southwest Missouri State University—now known as Missouri State University–1955 and at Northeastern Oklahoma State University from 1956 to 1961, where he led his team to the NAIA Football National Championship in 1958.

Head coaching record

College

References

External links
 

1920 births
1994 deaths
American football halfbacks
Arkansas Tech Wonder Boys football coaches
Bacone Warriors football coaches
Missouri State Bears football coaches
Northeastern State RiverHawks football coaches
Northeastern State RiverHawks football players
Tulsa Golden Hurricane football players
Junior college football coaches in the United States
People from Tahlequah, Oklahoma
Sportspeople from Tulsa, Oklahoma
Coaches of American football from Oklahoma
Players of American football from Oklahoma